Rozanne Slik (born 12 April 1991) is a Dutch professional racing cyclist, who most recently rode for UCI Women's Continental Team . She is the sister of racing cyclist Ivar Slik.

Major results

2014
 9th Overall Tour of Zhoushan Island
2015
 1st Stage 2 Auensteiner–Radsporttage
2016
 4th Overall La Route de France
2018
 1st Stage 5 Thüringen Rundfahrt der Frauen
 9th Grand Prix de Dottignies
2021
 3rd  Beach race, UEC European Mountain Bike Championships

See also
 2014 Parkhotel Valkenburg Continental Team season

References

External links

1991 births
Living people
Dutch female cyclists
People from Bergen, North Holland
Cyclists from North Holland
21st-century Dutch women